The 1985 Clásica de San Sebastián was the 5th edition of the Clásica de San Sebastián cycle race and was held on 16 August 1985. The race started and finished in San Sebastián. The race was won by Adri van der Poel of the Kwantum team.

General classification

References

Clásica de San Sebastián
San